George Torode (30 September 1946 – 20 April 2010) was a Guernsey author, comedian and radio host. He was best known for his series of writings called the Donkey books, which collect stories by and about Guernsey people (the nickname for Guernsey people is Les ânes "Donkeys")

GEORGE TORODE PHOTO

 Donkey's Ears Ago - 1996 - 
 Donkey's Ears Apart - 1997 - 
 Donkey's serenade - 1998 - 
 Donkey's Tails - 1999 - 
 Donkey's Hind Leg  - 2000 - 
 The Donkey's Back - 2004 - . 
 The Donkey Rides Out - 2005 -     This volume includes a lengthy section (pp123–167) about the pioneering motor engineer and entrepreneur, Dorothee Pullinger. It is almost unique in the materials published about her, in that Torode actually knew her and the materials he uses are largely based on his own recollections of interviews some 20+ years previously.
 Donkey's at Work - 2009 -

Radio
Mr Torode also co-hosted a radio program with Fred Hewlett on BBC Guernsey.

Death
Mr Torode died on 20 April 2010, at the age of 63.

References

1946 births
2010 deaths
Guernsey writers